Judy Forgot is a play by Avery Hopwood (New York, October 6, 1910) that was adapted into a 1915 film. The film is a five part comedy. Marie Cahill starred in the film. T. Hayes Hunter directed. It was produced by Universal Film Manufacturing. It was advertised as a screaming farce comedy hit filmed in five acts. Raymond L. Schrock wrote the screenplay.

Cahill portrayed Judy Evans in the play and film. She loses her memory in a train wreck. Her memory is later restored after an auto accident and she returns to her marital partner.

Film cast
Marie Cahill
Sam Handy as Freddy

References

Comedy plays
1910 plays